Başak railway station is a railway station in Kartal, Istanbul on the Marmaray commuter rail line. The station is one of three new stations built on the line along with Ataköy and Darıca.

Başak station consists of an island platform serving two tracks and a third express track on the south side. The station opened on 13 March 2019, together with phase II of the Marmaray project.

References

External links
Marmaray
TCDD Taşımacılık
Turkish State Railways

Railway stations in Istanbul Province
Railway stations opened in 2018
2018 establishments in Turkey
Kartal